Lantto is a surname. Notable people with the surname include:

Ivar Lantto (1862–1938), Finnish politician
Jonas Lantto (born 1987), Swedish footballer

See also
Lanto (disambiguation)